NCAA March Madness 2000 is the 1999 installment in the NCAA March Madness series. Former Maryland player Steve Francis is featured on the cover.

Reception

The game received favorable reviews according to the review aggregation website GameRankings.

See also
 NBA Live 2000

References

External links
 

1999 video games
Basketball video games
EA Sports games
NCAA video games
North America-exclusive video games
PlayStation (console) games
PlayStation (console)-only games
Video games developed in the United States
Black Ops Entertainment games
Multiplayer and single-player video games